Neaethus maculatus is a species of tropiduchid planthopper in the family Tropiduchidae. It is found in North America.

Subspecies
These two subspecies belong to the species Neaethus maculatus:
 Neaethus maculatus fasciatus Van Duzee, 1917
 Neaethus maculatus maculatus Melichar, 1906

References

Articles created by Qbugbot
Insects described in 1906
Gaetuliini